The Christ Child Distributing Bread to Pilgrims is a 1678 oil on canvas painting by Bartolomé Esteban Murillo, now in the Museum of Fine Arts in Budapest. The pilgrim shown with a book is thought to be a portrait of Canon Justino de Neve.

References

Paintings by Bartolomé Esteban Murillo
1678 paintings
Paintings in the collection of the Museum of Fine Arts (Budapest)
Paintings of the Madonna and Child
Angels in art